MIQ may refer to:
 MIQ (vocalist) (born 1955), Japanese pop singer and vocal trainer
 MIQ, Millard Airport (Nebraska), an airport in the United States (IATA code)
 MIQ, term used for New Zealand's COVID-19 managed isolation and quarantine 
 minimal interpretation of quantum mechanics (MIQ)
 machine intelligence quotient (MIQ)